Itapetininga is a municipality in the state of São Paulo, Brazil. The population is 165,526 (2020 est.) in an area of 1790 km2. The name comes from a Tupi-Guarani language, meaning "dry stone".

It is situated in the southern part of the state, and is known as cidade das escolas, meaning city of schools in Portuguese.

History

Itapetininga developed along with the "tropeirismo" (Trooping), as a resting point of the cattle dealers, who were mounting groups and villages for the landing, before they travel towards the South. The first nucleus of cattle dealers in the region of Itapetininga appeared in 1724, when it was discovered that the pasture in the region was abundant and the land was fertile for planting. To these factors there was added up the distance to the Sorocaba town - 12 leagues - that was corresponding to a journey of a troop.

At this time there was an argument between two nucleuses that wanted to be elevated to the condition of town. The results: on April 17, 1770, Simão Barbosa Franco was nominated to establish and administering the new village, and so was left to him the choice of the principal nucleus. Historians tell that a "marching" mule, offered as a present to Simão Barbosa Franco, guaranteed the victory to Domingos José Vieira. The town of Nossa Senhora dos Prazeres de Itapetininga was officially created on November 5, 1770, when a solemn mass was celebrated by the vicar of the new parish, Priest Inácio of Araújo Ferreira. It is in this date that was agreed to commemorate the anniversary of the municipality.

Besides Simão Barbosa Franco and Domingos José Vieira, an Itu town citizen. Salvador de Oliveira Leme (-nicknamed  Sarutayá )- has been  included among the historical founders of the municipality, since he was the second captain-mor of Itapetininga (the first one was Domingos José Vieira). The emancipation of the Town of Itapetininga happened in 1852, through the Law nº 11, on July 7, 1852. The law granted judicial autonomy, thus creating to judicature of Itapetininga. The town, however, only became a municipality, in fact, on March 13, 1855 with the name of Itapetininga.

The holy patron of Itapetininga is Our Lady of the Pleasures.

Guelem 
Influent illustrator and comic artist from Itapetininga, he is famous for working on the tabletop RPG "O Círculo de Fogo", as concept artist and illustrator. He also works as a freelancer, and is possibly part of the group "Os The Boys", that is commonly mistaken for the terrorist group.

References